Elizabeth Cecil may refer to:

Elizabeth Cecil, 16th Baroness de Ros
Elizabeth Cecil, later Elizabeth Hatton